El Sombrerón is a legendary character and one of the most famous legends of Guatemala, told in books  and film   El Sombrerón is also a bogeyman figure in Mexico.

This character is also known with other names, like Tzipitio, the goblin, and sometimes Tzizimite, his main characteristics are always the same: a short man with black dress, a thick and brilliant belt; he wears a black, large hat and boots that make a lot of noise when he walks.

He likes to ride horses and braid their tails and manes. When he cannot find horses, he braids the hair of dogs. He also likes to court young ladies who have long hair and big eyes. When he likes one in particular, he follows her, braids her hair, serenades to her with his silver guitar; but he also puts soil in her plate and she is not able to eat or sleep.

El Sombrerón appears at dusk, dragging along a group of mules carrying coal, with whom he travels around the city and its neighborhoods. When a woman responds to his love, he ties the mules to the house's pole where she lives, unhooks his guitar and starts singing and dancing. Some residents from the neighborhoods of La Recolección and Parroquia Vieja say he still wanders at nights when there is a full moon.

El Sombreron is one of the most important legends of Guatemala, as are: La Llorona, Cadejo, Siguanaba.

The legend 

In the neighborhood of La Recolección lived a woman named Susana, a young lady, daughter of the woman who owned the store. She was a very pretty girl, with long hair and big, hazelnut eyes.

One night, when there was a full moon, she was on the balcony admiring the sky.

Suddenly a short character with a big hat and a guitar approached her. Her beauty amazed him.

He sang her a song, but at that moment her parents found out she was out and made her get inside the house. Since that day she was not able to sleep anymore because this character appeared in the house or sang to her from the street. She was not able to eat either, because every time they served her food it was contaminated with soil.

Worried, the parents cut her hair and took it to the church so that the priest would put holy water on it and would pray for her. A few days later El Sombrerón stopped bothering her.

Culturally, the legend advises teenage girls to preserve the collective values of a society.

Cultural influence
In 1950, El Sombrerón became the subject of the eponymous film, one of the first films shot in Guatemala.

References 

Spanish-language Mesoamerican legendary creatures
Guatemalan folklore
Mythology of the Americas
South American mythology
Mexican mythology
Goblins
Bogeymen